The ITUC Regional Organisation for Africa (ITUC-Africa) is a regional organisation of the International Trade Union Confederation, representing trade unions from countries in Africa. There are 56 national trade union federations affiliated to ITUC-Africa, from 45 countries, and representing a total of 15 million workers.

History
The organisation was founded in 2007, at a congress in Accra, with the merger of the ICFTU African Regional Organisation and the World Confederation of Labour's Democratic Organization of African Workers' Trade Union.

The organisation has six main departments, handling conflict resolution, economic & social policy, education, gender & equality, HIV/AIDS, and human & trade union rights. In its own words,
ICFTU-AFRO seeks to fight poverty, unemployment and all forms of discrimination, exploitation, arbitrary unrests, detention without trial and unlawful dismissals.

Affiliates

Leadership

General Secretaries
2007: Kwasi Adu-Amankwah

Presidents
2007: Mody Guiro

References

 2004 ICFTU-AFRO news archives

External links
 Website of ITUC-Africa

 
1957 establishments in Africa
Trade unions established in 1957